Niral Purty is an Indian politician and an MLA elected from Majhgaon block of Jharkhand state as a member of Jharkhand Mukti Morcha 2019.

References

Living people
21st-century Indian politicians
Lok Sabha members from Jharkhand
People from Jharkhand
Date of birth missing (living people)
Place of birth missing (living people)
Year of birth missing (living people)